The Anaheim Elementary School District (AESD) is a public school district serving the City of Anaheim in Southern California, United States.  It oversees 25 schools with an enrollment of approximately 17,000 PreK-6 students making it the second largest elementary school district in the state.  AESD is a feeder district to Anaheim Union High School District. 
Anaheim Elementary Education Association (AEEA) is the voice of the educators in Anaheim Elementary since 1948 and is an affiliate of CTA/NEA.

Schools
Anaheim Elementary Online Academy 
Barton Elementary School
Edison Elementary School
Franklin Elementary School
Gauer Elementary School
Guinn Elementary School
Henry Elementary School
Jefferson Elementary School
Juarez Elementary School
Lincoln Elementary School
Loara Elementary School
Madison Elementary School
Mann Elementary School
Marshall Elementary School
Olive Street Elementary School
Orange Grove Elementary School
Palm Lane Elementary School
Ponderosa Elementary School
Price Elementary School
Revere Elementary School
Roosevelt Elementary School
Ross Elementary School
Stoddard Elementary School
Sunkist Elementary School
Westmont Elementary School

Note: AEOA is an online school And Palm Lane is a charter school

References

External links

 

School districts in Orange County, California
Education in Anaheim, California
Educational institutions in the United States with year of establishment missing